Dermophis gracilior is a species of caecilian in the family Dermophiidae. It is found on the Pacific slopes of Cordillera de Talamanca in eastern Costa Rica and western Panama, as well as in the central Pacific Costa Rica. Some sources also report it from the Atlantic slope of Costa Rica.

Description
It has 91–117 primary and 65–96 secondary annuli. The body is somewhat robust (length 23 to 34 times the body width). The upper surface is lead-gray in color, whereas the lower one is cream with dark mottling, or largely gray to dull black. The annular grooves are similarly colored as the adjacent areas.

Habitat and conservation
It is a subterranean species that can be found under logs and surface debris. It is probably viviparous.

D. gracilior is a  poorly known species known from few specimens. Deforestation might be a threat to it. It is found in the La Amistad International Park (Panama) and in the Las Cruces Biological Station (Costa Rica).

References

gracilior
Amphibians of Costa Rica
Amphibians of Panama
Amphibians described in 1902
Taxa named by Albert Günther
Taxonomy articles created by Polbot